USS Lioba (AF-36) was an Adria-class stores ship in service with the United States Navy from 1945 to 1955. She was scrapped in 1973.

History
Lioba was laid down under Maritime Commission contract 23 June 1944 by Pennsylvania Shipyard, Beaumont, Texas; launched 27 August 1944; sponsored by Mrs. W. B. Porter; acquired by the Navy 17 February 1945; and commissioned 6 March 1945.

World War II service
After shakedown in the Gulf of Mexico, the refrigerated cargo ship departed Mobile, Alabama, 30 March 1945, for Pearl Harbor en route to Ulithi and Okinawa with mail and cargo for the fighting men pushing towards Japan and victory. Arriving Okinawa 4 June, Lioba supplied fresh meat and provisions to navy ships anchored off Hagushi Beach. Departing a week later, she steamed for New Zealand, arrived 19 June, loaded cargo at Auckland and Napier, New Zealand, and sailed 1 August for Pearl Harbor.

Post-war activity
Arriving 8 August, she celebrated V-J Day unloading cargo, and departed 24 August for San Francisco, California. A week later the hard working reefer, loaded with 1,600 tons of fleet issue cargo, again steamed for the western Pacific. After discharging chilled and dry provisions for occupation forces at Guam, Saipan, Tinian and Tokyo, she returned to San Francisco 20 January 1946.
 
Departing 10 February, Lioba made one more cargo run to Yokosuka and the Pacific Islands, returned to San Francisco 10 May, and sailed 2 days later for the U.S. East Coast. Arriving Hampton Roads 30 May, for the remainder of 1946 she steamed along the Atlantic coast and in the Caribbean, visiting Boston, Massachusetts, Bayonne, New Jersey, Charleston, South Carolina, Puerto Rico, and Trinidad.

North Atlantic operations
For the next 9 years, as the U.S. Navy provided the key bulwark for a Europe threatened by communism, Lioba operated with the Service Force, Atlantic Fleet, supporting the Navy’s effort to keep the peace in the North Atlantic Ocean and Mediterranean. The ship departed Boston, Massachusetts, 10 January 1947 for the first of 11 Mediterranean cruises, transporting provisions to the U.S. 6th Fleet at Golfe Juan, France, and Naples, Italy.
 
Sandwiched between Mediterranean duty, Lioba completed three training cruises to Guantanamo Bay, Cuba, and carried fresh meat and supplies to other Navy outposts in the Caribbean.

Decommissioning  and fate
Lioba departed Naples, Italy, 10 April 1955 for her final passage to the United States, arriving Norfolk, Virginia, the 24th. On 30 July she steamed to Charleston, South Carolina, where she decommissioned 14 October 1955, and entered the Atlantic Reserve Fleet. She remained there until transferred to the Maritime Commission and struck from the Navy list 1 July 1960. She entered the National Defense Reserve Fleet and was berthed in the James River, Virginia, into 1969. Final Disposition, scrapped in 1973.

Military awards and honors
The Navy record does not reflect any battle stars awarded to Lioba. However, her crew was eligible for the following medals:
 American Campaign Medal
 Asiatic-Pacific Campaign Medal
 World War II Victory Medal
 Navy Occupation Service Medal (with Asia clasp)
 National Defense Service Medal

References

External links

 NavSource Online: Service Ship Photo Archive - AF-36 Lioba

Adria-class stores ships
Ships built in Beaumont, Texas
1944 ships
World War II auxiliary ships of the United States